Professor Shonkur Kandokarkhana (Professor Shonku's Deeds) is a Professor Shonku series book written by Satyajit Ray and published by Ananda Publishers in 1970. Ray wrote the stories about Professor Shanku for the Bengali magazines Sandesh and Anandamela. This book is a collection of seven Shonku stories.

Stories
 Professor Shonku o Robu (Sandesh, February and March 1968),
 Professor Shonku o Cochabambar Guha (Sandesh, May 1969),
 Professor Shonku o Raktamatsya Rahashya (Sandesh, May and June 1968),
 Professor Shanku o Gorilla (Sandesh, autumn 1969),
 Professor Shonku o Baghdader Baksho (Sandesh, March and April 1970)

See also
 Punashcha Professor Shonku
 Selam Professor Shonku

References

Science fiction short stories
Professor Shonku short stories